Trifluoromethane or fluoroform is the chemical compound with the formula CHF3.  It is one of the "haloforms", a class of compounds with the formula CHX3 (X = halogen) with C3v symmetry.  Fluoroform is used in diverse applications in organic synthesis.  It is not an ozone depleter but is a greenhouse gas.

Synthesis 
About 20M kg/y are produced industrially as both a by-product of and precursor to the manufacture of Teflon.  It is produced by reaction of chloroform with HF:
CHCl3  +  3 HF  →   CHF3  +  3 HCl

It is also generated biologically in small amounts apparently by decarboxylation of trifluoroacetic acid.

Historical
Fluoroform was first obtained by Maurice Meslans in the violent reaction of iodoform with dry silver fluoride in 1894. The reaction was improved by Otto Ruff by substitution of silver fluoride by a mixture of mercury fluoride and calcium fluoride. The exchange reaction works with iodoform and bromoform, and the exchange of the first two halogen atoms by fluorine is vigorous. By changing to a two step process, first forming a bromodifluoro methane in the reaction of antimony trifluoride with bromoform and finishing the reaction with mercury fluoride the first efficient synthesis method was found by Henne.

Industrial applications 
CHF3 is used in the semiconductor industry in plasma etching of silicon oxide and silicon nitride.  Known as R-23 or HFC-23, it was also a useful refrigerant, sometimes as a replacement for chlorotrifluoromethane (CFC-13) and is a byproduct of its manufacture.

When used as a fire suppressant, the fluoroform carries the DuPont trade name, FE-13.  CHF3 is recommended for this application because of its low toxicity, its low reactivity, and its high density. HFC-23 has been used in the past as a replacement for Halon 1301[CFC-13B1] in fire suppression systems as a total flooding gaseous fire suppression agent.

Organic chemistry 
Fluoroform is weakly acidic with a pKa = 25–28 and quite inert. Attempted deprotonation results in defluorination to generate F− and difluorocarbene (CF2).  Some organocopper and organocadmium compounds have been developed as trifluoromethylation reagents.

Fluoroform is a precursor of the Ruppert-Prakash reagent CF3Si(CH3)3, which is a source of the nucleophilic CF3− anion.

Greenhouse gas 

CHF3 is a potent greenhouse gas. A ton of HFC-23 in the atmosphere has the same effect as 11,700 tons of carbon dioxide.  This equivalency, also called a 100-yr global warming potential, is slightly larger at 14,800 for HFC-23.
The atmospheric lifetime is 270 years.

HFC-23 was the most abundant HFC in the global atmosphere until around 2001, which is when the global mean concentration of HFC-134a (1,1,1,2-tetrafluoroethane), the chemical now used extensively in automobile air conditioners, surpassed those of HFC-23. Global emissions of HFC-23 have in the past been dominated by the inadvertent production and release during the manufacture of the refrigerant HCFC-22 (chlorodifluoromethane).

Substantial decreases in HFC-23 emissions by developed countries were reported from the 1990s to the 2000s: from 6-8 Gg/yr in the 1990s to 2.8 Gg/yr in 2007.

The  UNFCCC Clean Development Mechanism  provided funding and facilitated the destruction of HFC-23. 

Developing countries have become the largest producers of HCFC-23 in recent years according to data compiled by the Ozone Secretariat of the World Meteorological Organization. Emissions of all HFCs are included in the UNFCCCs Kyoto Protocol. To mitigate its impact, CHF3 can be destroyed with electric plasma arc technologies or by high temperature incineration.

References

Literature

External links 
 
 MSDS at Oxford University
 MSDS at mathesontrigas.com
 Coupling of fluoroform with aldehydes using an electrogenerated base

Additional physical properties 

Fluoroalkanes
Halomethanes
Refrigerants
Fire suppression agents
Greenhouse gases
Trifluoromethyl compounds